Ruan Snyman (born 9 March 1987) is a South African rugby union footballer. He plays as a scrum-half for the Racing Métro in the French Top 14.

He represented the Bulls in Super Rugby and the Blue Bulls in the Currie Cup and Vodacom Cup since representing them in the 2005 Craven Week tournament.

During the 2013 Currie Cup Premier Division season, he joined French Top 14 side Racing Métro for the 2013–14 Top 14 season, before joining  for the 2014 Vodacom Cup season.

References

External links

Bulls profile
itsrugby.co.uk profile

Living people
1987 births
South African rugby union players
Rugby union scrum-halves
Bulls (rugby union) players
Blue Bulls players
Rugby union players from Pretoria
University of Pretoria alumni
Afrikaner people